Sour Grapes may refer to:

 Sour grapes, an expression from "The Fox and the Grapes", one of Aesop's Fables
Sour Grapes (1998 film), a film by Larry David
Sour Grapes (2016 film), a film about Rudy Kurniawan
Sour Grapes (poetry collection), a book of poems by William Carlos Williams
Sour Grapes: Studies in the Subversion of Rationality, a 1983 book by Jon Elster
"Sour Grapes", a song by Puscifer from "V" Is for Vagina
"Sour Grapes", a song by John Prine from Diamonds in the Rough
"Sour Grapes", a song by The Descendents from Enjoy!
"Sour Grapes", a song by Cass Elliot from Bubblegum, Lemonade, and... Something for Mama
"Sour Grapes", a song by Le Sserafim from the album Fearless
Sour Grapes, a Strawberry Shortcake character

See also
Accismus
Appeal to spite